Kavanoz Ahmed Pasha was an Ottoman statesman who was Grand vizier of Ottoman Empire under Ahmed III's rule. Kavanoz Ahmed Pasha served as vizier from 22 August 1703 to 17 November 1703.

References

Pashas
18th-century Grand Viziers of the Ottoman Empire
1705 deaths
Turks from the Ottoman Empire
Year of birth unknown